Bays Mountain is a ridge of the Ridge-and-Valley Appalachians, located in eastern Tennessee.  It runs southwest to northeast, from just south of Knoxville to Kingsport.

Its southern segment is relatively low in elevation (up to about ).  In some places it essentially merges with the surrounding plains, especially where it is bisected by the French Broad River and the Nolichucky River.

It is not a single ridge, but rather a series of closely related ridges, some of which have names of their own(Fodderstack, Lost, Stone, Browns). The highest peak is Chimneytop Mountain, a spur ridge south of the main Bays Mountain ridge. Bays Mountain runs just south of the Holston River, which flows northeast to southwest. At Kingsport the Holston River curves east and south, splitting into three tributary forks that flow from Virginia to the northeast. Bays Mountain ends abruptly at this curve of the Holston River. Kingsport is on the north side of the river, directly across from the end of Bays Mountain, where two ridges meet in a "V" with an impounded lake (the old reservoir) between the ridges.

The name of Bays Mountain: Two Bays brothers settled in Southwest Virginia, Russell and Scott Counties about 1780. Bays Mountain received its name from this family as they were noted as great hunters.

Bays Mountain Park is a  nature park located on Bays Mountain in Kingsport, featuring cross-cut viewing sections of beaver dams, bee hives, cave systems, and more.  The park includes a planetarium, live native animal displays, a nature center, 19th-century living farm museum and adventure course.

References
Williams, "Fort Robinson on the Holston," East Tennessee Historical Society Publications, no.4 (1932)
Samuel C. Williams, Dawn of Tennessee Valley and Tennessee History (Johnson City, 1937)
Long, Howard. Kingsport: A Romance of Industry. Overmountain Press (October 1993)
Wolfe, Margaret Ripley. Kingsport Tennessee: A Planned American City. University Press of Kentucky (November 1987)
The Goodspeed Publishing Co., History of Tennessee 1887; pages 1252-1261; Greene County Biographical Sketches, Surnames M thru W; (D.W. Remine Biography)

External links

Ridges of Tennessee
Protected areas of Hawkins County, Tennessee
Protected areas of Sullivan County, Tennessee
Protected areas of the Appalachians
Landforms of Hawkins County, Tennessee
Landforms of Sullivan County, Tennessee